Bichette is a surname. Notable people with the surname include:

Bo Bichette (born 1998), American baseball player
Dante Bichette (born 1963), American baseball player and coach
Dante Bichette Jr. (born 1992), Brazilian-American baseball player, son of Dante and brother of Bo
Jessica Bichette (born 1980),